Nureddin Mahmud (born 1899) was the prime minister of Iraq from 23 November 1952 until 29 January 1953.

References

1899 births
Prime Ministers of Iraq
Year of death unknown